Ned Beauman (born 1985) is a British novelist, journalist and screenwriter. The author of five novels, he was selected as one of the Best of Young British Novelists by Granta magazine in 2013.

Biography 
Born in London, Beauman is the son of Persephone Books founder Nicola Beauman and economist Christopher Beauman. He studied Philosophy at the University of Cambridge. His influences include Jorge Luis Borges, Raymond Chandler and John Updike, along with more recent writers such as Michael Chabon, William Gibson and David Foster Wallace. All of his novels are published in the UK by Sceptre. In addition to novels, he has contributed journalism and literary criticism to The Guardian, The White Review, The London Review of Books, Cabinet and Fantastic Man.

Awards and honours
2011: Desmond Elliott Prize shortlist for Boxer, Beetle
2011: National Jewish Book Award winner in Debut Fiction for Boxer, Beetle
2012: Guardian First Book Award shortlist for Boxer, Beetle
2012: Man Booker Prize longlist for The Teleportation Accident
2012: Encore Award winner for The Teleportation Accident
2013: Somerset Maugham Award winner for The Teleportation Accident
2013: Granta list of 20 best young writers.

Works
2010: Boxer, Beetle
2012: The Teleportation Accident
2014: Glow
2017: Madness Is Better Than Defeat
2022: Venomous Lumpsucker

References

External links
 Official website

21st-century British novelists
Living people
British male novelists
21st-century British male writers
1985 births